Ibn Zuhra() (Arabic: اِبْنُ زُهْرَة) Shiite scholar and captain of the Saddah in Aleppo Faqih, Arabic grammarian, and Mutakallim, He was born in the sixth century AH. And he wrote a book of fiqh called Ghunyatu l-Nuzu and he has emerged by thinkers as Sahib al-Ghunya “.

Biography

His birth and lineage 
Ibn Zuhra was born in 7 Ramadan 511 AH / 1118 AD in the city of Aleppo in the northwest of the Levant (Syria) at the beginning of the sixth Hijri and twelfth centuries AD. His lineage goes back to Ishaq bin Ja'far al-Sadiq and that is why his family was known as the Ishaqis.

“He is Al-Sayyid Izz Al-Din Abu Al-Makarim Hamza bin Ali bin Abi Al-Mahasin Zuhra bin Abi Ali Al-Hassan bin Abi Al-Hasan bin Abi Al-Mahasin Zuhra bin Abi Al-Mawahib Ali bin Abi Salem Muhammad bin Ibrahim Muhammad Al-Naqib bin Ali, bin Abi Ali Ahmed bin Abi Ja'far Muhammad bin Abi Abdullah Al-Hussein  Ibn Abi-Ibrahim Ishaq al-Mutman Ibn Abi Abdullah Ja`far Ibn Mohammed al-Sadiq, peace be upon him, al-Husayni al-Halabi".

Scientific 
Ibn Zuhra was a faqih, usuli, mutakallim, grammarian, and trustworthy, according to Shiite scholars, and the Captain of the Sadda of Aleppo, and he is the most famous member of his family, "Ibn Zuhra", up to the point where he was the one who meant when the name "Ibn Zuhra" was mentioned without any other presumption.

He started his science education with his father and obtained a license to Riwaiya from him. He was tutored with his grandfather Abu Al-Mahasin Zuhra Al-Halabi, in addition to Muhammad bin Hassan bin Mansour, as well as Sheikh Abi Abdullah Hussein bin Taher Al-Suri, and Abu Mansour Muhammad bin Al-Hassan Al-Naqash Al-Mawsili.

Expiration 
Ibn Zuhra died in 585 A.H. and was buried at the foot of Jabal Goshan in the west of Aleppo, close to Mashhad Al-Saukt. His tomb was discovered in 1297 AH, and on it was found a handwritten script that reads:

"In the name of God, the most compassionate, the most merciful this is the respectful tomb of Abi l-Makarim Hamza b. 'Ali b. Zuhra b. 'Ali b. Muhammad b. Muhammad b. Ahmad b. Muhammad b. al-Husayn b. Ishaq b. Ja'far al-Sadiq, peace be upon him and his ancestors and his offsprings and purified 'a'imma, and his death was in 585 AH (God bless him)"

References 

1118 births
1189 deaths
People from Aleppo